kelvin (symbol: K) is the SI base unit of temperature.

Kelvin may also refer to:

People
 William Thomson, 1st Baron Kelvin, physicist, namesake of kelvin, unit of temperature
 Robert Smith, Baron Smith of Kelvin, former Governor of the BBC
 Kelvin (surname)
 Kelvin (given name), a list of people with the name
 Kelvin (footballer, born 1993), Kelvin Mateus de Oliveira, Brazilian football winger
 Kelvin (footballer, born 1997), Kelvin Giacobe Alves dos Santos, Brazilian football forward

Places

Scotland, UK 
 Glasgow Kelvin (Scottish Parliament constituency)
 Glasgow Kelvin (UK Parliament constituency) 
 Kelvin Aqueduct, Glasgow
 Kelvin Hall, Glasgow
 Kelvin, South Lanarkshire, an industrial district
 River Kelvin, Glasgow

United States  
 Kelvin, North Dakota, an unincorporated community
 Kelvin (Pittsboro, North Carolina), a NRHP-listed house
 Kelvin Formation, Utah

Moon
 Rupes Kelvin
 Promontorium Kelvin

Other
 Kelvin Peninsula, New Zealand
 Kelvin Seamount, a guyot in the Atlantic Ocean
 Kelvin Island (Lake Nipigon), Canada
 Kelvin, Bringelly, Australia

Companies 
 Kelvin Central Buses, Scottish transport company
 Kelvin Diesels, Scottish manufacturer of marine diesel engines
 Kelvin Hughes, Scottish marine systems company
 Kelvin Scottish, Scottish transport company

Vessels 
 , a ship
 , a cable ship
 USS Kelvin, a fictional starship in the movie Star Trek (2009)

Other uses 
 Kelvin, a unit of measure for color temperature
 Cyclone Kelvin
 Kelvin High School, in Winnipeg, Manitoba
 Kelvin (microarchitecture), NVIDIA GPU

See also 
 Kelvin Grove (disambiguation)
 List of things named after Lord Kelvin
 Kelvyn (disambiguation)